Hotel Norton is a historic hotel building located in Norton, Virginia. It was built in 1921, and is a six-story Colonial Revival style building consisting of a cut sandstone base, brick middle, and a deep stone and wood entablature.  The interior features a two-story lobby with a decorative mezzanine level balcony. The hotel was abandoned in the 1970s and 1980s and subsequently acquired by the City of Norton for redevelopment.

It was listed on the National Register of Historic Places in 2002.

References

Hotel buildings on the National Register of Historic Places in Virginia
Colonial Revival architecture in Virginia
Hotel buildings completed in 1921
National Register of Historic Places in Norton, Virginia